Paraconodontida is an extinct order of conodonts. It contains two superfamilies, Amphigeisinoidea and Furnishinoidea.

References

External links 

 
 Paraconodontida at fossilworks.org (retrieved 9 May 2016)

 
Prehistoric jawless fish orders